"Who Goes There" is the fourth episode of the first season of the American anthology crime drama television series True Detective. The episode was written by series creator Nic Pizzolatto, and directed by executive producer Cary Joji Fukunaga. It was first broadcast on HBO in the United States on February 9, 2014.

The season focuses on Louisiana State Police homicide detectives Rustin "Rust" Cohle (Matthew McConaughey) and Martin "Marty" Hart (Woody Harrelson), who investigate the murder of prostitute Dora Lange in 1995. Seventeen years later, they must revisit the investigation, along with several other unsolved crimes. In the episode, Cohle and Hart identify a connection to Reggie Ledoux and seek to infiltrate a biker gang to get his location. 

According to Nielsen Media Research, the episode was seen by an estimated 1.99 million household viewers and gained a 0.8 ratings share among adults aged 18–49. The episode received critical acclaim, with critics praising character development, writing, directing, performances and tension. The six-minute sequence where Rust Cohle takes part in a raid received universal acclaim. For the episode, Cary Joji Fukunaga won Outstanding Directing for a Drama Series at the 66th Primetime Emmy Awards.

Plot

2012
Cohle (Matthew McConaughey) is questioned by Gilbough (Michael Potts) and Papania (Tory Kittles) for taking a sick leave, where he claims that he visited his dying father in Alaska. They also separately question Hart (Woody Harrelson) on the claim, as medical records show no evidence of Cohle's father even being in the state for 30 years.

1995
Cohle and Hart confront Charlie Lange (Brad Carter) at his prison cell. Charlie acknowledges finding Reggie Ledoux as a weird person, revealing that Ledoux knew about a place where rich people would kill women and children for satanistic rituals to worship "The Yellow King". He tells them they should look for one of Ledoux's associates, Tyrone Weems (Todd Giebenhain). Before they leave, Charlie reveals he showed pictures of Dora to Ledoux, with the pair indicating that he may be responsible for her death.

While testifying at court, Hart is confronted by Lisa (Alexandra Daddario), who works as a stenographer, for the fight at her apartment. Hart does not recognize anything wrong with his actions and insults her. In retaliation, she tells Maggie (Michelle Monaghan) about their affair and she and her daughters leave their house to live with her parents, also packing Hart's bags so he can leave. Hart tries to contact her but his attempts are rebuffed by her father.

Cohle and Hart question Weems' ex-girlfriend, a stripper named Kelsey (Amber Carollo). Kelsey is dismissive of any help but the bartender (Nic Pizzolatto) tells Hart that she has kept seeing Weems. At night, Hart follows Kelsey to a rave and finds Weems. He forces Weems to give him Ledoux's location, and he reveals that Ledoux cooks drugs for a biker gang named Iron Crusaders in East Texas. He then talks to Maggie at the hospital where she works but she does not want to talk with him. As security guards start to retrieve him, Cohle arrives to take him and work on a new lead on Ledoux.

Cohle knows the Iron Crusaders, having served with them while he worked undercover. The gang believes that he died on a raid, which he uses to return without having his cover blown. Cohle gets sick leave from the police without notifying them about their intended plan, claiming that he is visiting his father in Alaska. He also retrieves cocaine from the evidence room and starts faking needle marks. Before he leaves to meet the gang, Cohle meets with Maggie to convince her to allow Hart to see his daughters and amend their relationship. Maggie does not accept any of Hart's actions, nor Cohle's justifications of them, but Cohle later tells Hart that Maggie may soon forgive him.

At a bar frequented by the gang, Cohle meets with his contact, Ginger (Joseph Sikora), using his fake name "Crash". After giving a fake story, Cohle states he wants to meet with their meth supplier. Ginger agrees to arrange a meeting, but only if Cohle helps him with a raid to rob a rival gang. With no other choice, Cohle agrees to help. Having lost track of Cohle, Hart infiltrates the bar and is confronted by the gang members. He is kicked out, but sees Cohle leave with Ginger and other members in a boat on the bayou.

At Ginger's trailer house, the gang prepares for the raid, while Cohle is forced to use drugs. They don police uniforms before departing for the raid. Having kidnapped a member of the rival gang, they make their way through the house while Ginger starts retrieving the drugs. However, one of the members kills a man in the house, and the event quickly escalates into a gunfight. Cohle attacks Ginger and retrieves him from the house just as the police arrive and the conflict escalates even further. Cohle and Ginger escape through the neighborhood and avoid the gangs. They reach Hart's car and they leave the neighborhood. Cohle then starts punching Ginger to get him to talk about Ledoux's location and the conflict at the neighborhood continues.

Production

Development
In January 2014, the episode's title was revealed as "Who Goes There" and it was announced that series creator Nic Pizzolatto had written the episode while executive producer Cary Joji Fukunaga had directed it. This was Pizzolatto's fourth writing credit, and Fukunaga's fourth directing credit.

Filming
The episode included a six-minute long take, in which Rust Cohle (Matthew McConaughey) takes part in a raid gone awry. Director Cary Joji Fukunaga already used the technique in his previous films Sin nombre and Jane Eyre, and signed on to direct the series knowing that he would use the technique as well. When he read the script for the episode, he knew that the raid scene would be the one shot in a long take. The crew obtained permission to shoot in a housing project, after which Fukunaga started planning all possible routes to shoot the sequence. Fukunaga commented, "Even the action, the stunt sequences were complicated. We're working on a television schedule. It isn't like a film where you can spend a lot of time working the stunts out with the actors. We only had a day and a half to get Matthew and everyone else on the same page."

The most difficult scene to film involved Cohle and Ginger climbing over a chain-link fence. As the crew wasn't allowed to tear apart the fence, many options were considered. Eventually, they settled on the Steadicam operator being placed on an elevated jib to help them film the sequence. In total, the six-minute sequence was shot seven times, with the first three being discarded for its inefficient execution. During filming, Fukunaga filmed possible spots so he could include two takes if the long take wasn't possible, but the final cut consists of a real long take.

In 2018, Fukunaga revealed that Pizzolatto wanted to cut up the sequence during post-production, explaining "He did not like that I was pushing for that one at all. I mean, there's nothing really that inventive about [True Detective]. It's just another crime drama. Let's do something fun."

Reception

Viewers
The episode was watched by 1.99 million viewers, earning a 0.8 in the 18-49 rating demographics on the Nielson ratings scale. This means that 0.8 percent of all households with televisions watched the episode. This was a slight increase from the previous episode, which was watched by 1.93 million viewers with a 0.8 in the 18-49 demographics.

Critical reviews

"Who Goes There" received critical acclaim. Jim Vejvoda of IGN gave the episode an "amazing" 9.2 out of 10 and wrote in his verdict, "Hart's lies finally catch up to him even as more lies are needed to be told in order for him and Cohle to track down the prime suspect in Dora Lange's murder. This ultimately tense and violent episode, the halfway point of the series, sees Cohle go undercover and bloody mayhem ensue."

Erik Adams of The A.V. Club gave the episode an "A" grade and wrote, "But boy howdy — we might not see another sequence of such sustained tension on our TVs in 2014. This is the crowning achievement of Cary Fukunaga's True Detective direction thus far: A six-minute, unbroken tracking shot following Rust's participation in the Iron Crusaders' raid gone bad. From the backseat of the biker gang's truck to the rear of Marty's squad car, it's a nail-biter — a signature moment for the series that isn't Tumblr-parody-ready." Britt Hayes of Screen Crush wrote, "Like Rust, 'Who Goes There' goes off the rails a bit tonight, devolving into a totally different kind of show -- not that this is entirely a bad thing. There's this dark, frenetic energy to the back half, and if there's one complaint it's that Marty gets short-changed a bit and that by the end of the episode we still don't have our guy... which dashes my hopes that Rust and Marty are going to be teaming up in present day any time soon. McConaughey is on fire tonight, though, totally ruling the episode from beginning to end."

Alan Sepinwall of HitFix wrote, "But beyond that one sequence, 'Who Goes There' is an impressive visual example of what's been a gorgeous series to date. The plot is already constructed in a puzzle box fashion, as all the characters in 2012 know more than we do, and as we're given information and certain events out of order, and it's lovely to see the visuals presented the same way at times." Gwilym Mumford of The Guardian wrote, "Rather than learn more about the masked man at the end of episode three, we make a left turn into east Texan biker gangs – but far from being padding, the episode leads to the season's most electric and daring scene yet." Kevin Jagernauth of IndieWire gave the episode an "A" grade and wrote, "What else can be said about the finale without dipping into hyberbole? Over the hump and heading into the last four episodes, True Detective is running on a high that few shows can claim even well into a few seasons. Of course, it will be all about sticking the landing, but on its own, 'Who Goes There' is the best episode of the season so far, hands down."

James Poniewozik of TIME wrote, "It was one of the most amazing scenes you're likely to see on TV all year, and yet the episode wasn't quite done. As Marty peeled off from the crime scene, there was another shift in perspective, an overhead shot that pulled revealed a full-on police assault, a helicopter wheeling into position below us. It was as if we had dived into some murky, surreal deep sea with Cohle, and we were now rising up, up, back to the surface, where finally, we could breathe again." Kenny Herzog of Vulture gave the episode a 4 star rating out of 5 and wrote, "All of which brings us to True Detectives halfway point, and the fair task of figuring out just what it is we know: A prostitute is dead, some kind of Satanic cult with a spiral tattoo as calling card is sacrificing myriad victims, massive meth cooker Reggie Ledoux is not entirely uninvolved, and Hart and Cohle are two typically damaged detectives rooming together in 1995 and feeding each other's obsessions as the improbable end result of stupidity and circumstance. Oh, and that Hart has whiskey dick." Tony Sokol of Den of Geek gave the episode a 4 star rating out of 5 and wrote, "Matthew McConaughey cuts loose on Cohle in the projects, or whatever the projects are called in Louisiana. I was so confused I'd almost ask Det. Maynard Gilbough and Detective Shinn what was going on? Why did he keep punching the guy who brought him there? Who did he shoot to get out of there? That was probably my bad. Did they say 'my bad' yet in the early nineties? Buy me a drink and I'll tell you." 

Matt Richenthal of TV Fanatic gave the episode a 4.1 star rating out of 5 and wrote, "Overall, one of the best aspects of True Detective is that I have no clue where it's going to end up. We didn't spend much time in 2012 this week, but we know a new serial killer is on the loose. Or that the old one was never actually found. And we know Marty and Rust had a major falling out." Shane Ryan of Paste gave the episode a 9.8 out of 10 and wrote, "Cary Joji Fukunaga. I wanted to lead with that name, because when we talk about True Detective, we don't say it enough. We say 'Matthew McConaughey' and we say 'Woody Harrelson' and we say 'Nic Pizzolatto', and we're not wrong. In fact, we're really, really right. But we've been looking at three sides of a square and mistaking it for a triangle. We've seen the unity, the duality and the trinity, and maybe that was the most we could hope to consider in three episodes. Because, really, who's ever heard of a quaternity? Who looks at a dense forest full of massive trunks and crawling vines and leafy canopies, and says, 'man, that soil must be fertile as hell'? Who watches great actors enlivened by great writing and wastes a thought on the director? Not us. Not yet."

Accolades
For the episode, Cary Joji Fukunaga won Outstanding Directing for a Drama Series at the 66th Primetime Emmy Awards.

TVLine named Woody Harrelson the "Performer of the Week" for the week of March 23, 2013, for his performance in the episode. The site wrote, "In the wake of an episode that ends with a nail-biting, completely bananas shootout/hostage situation/nighttime escape — captured with an epic, six-minute tracking shot — we still can't shake the equally stirring but far quieter work of Woody Harrelson as a deeply flawed husband coming to grips with the sudden but inevitable collapse of his marriage."

References

External links
 "Who Goes There" at HBO
 

2014 American television episodes
Emmy Award-winning episodes
True Detective episodes
Television episodes written by Nic Pizzolatto